Sandar may refer to:

People
 Sandar (actress) (1949–2006), Burmese actress
 Alek Sandar (born 1987), Bulgarian music producer and songwriter
 Ma Sandar (born 1947), Burmese writer
 Sandar Min (born 1968), Burmese politician
 Sandar Win (born 1952), Burmese politician

Places
 Sandar, Cambodia, a commune in Leuk Daek District
 Sandar, Malta, a zone in Mtarfa
 Sandar, Norway
 Sandar, Sierra Leone, a chiefdom of Kailahun District

Other
 Sandar (landform), an outwash plain formed by glacial action.
 Sandar IL, club in Sandefjord, Norway
 Juilin Sandar, a character in Wheel of Time

See also
 
 Sander (disambiguation)
 Sandara
 Sandra (disambiguation)